The Gârbău is a left tributary of the river Durbav in Romania. It flows through the city Săcele, and discharges into the Durbav north of Săcele.

References

Rivers of Romania
Rivers of Brașov County
Săcele